From January 2007 to May 2007, the number-one singles in Canada were compiled by the American-based music sales tracking company, Nielsen SoundScan. The chart is compiled every Wednesday, and is published by Jam! Canoe on Thursdays. On 31 March 2007, Billboard magazine created the Canadian Hot 100, a chart specifically designed for Canada and the first Hot 100 chart that Billboard created for a country outside the United States. The chart was made available for the first time via Billboard online services on June 7, 2007, and it served as the successor to the Canadian Digital Song Sales Chart.

Canadian Singles Chart: January 2007 – May 2007

The following lists the number-one best-selling singles in Canada in 2007 published in Billboard magazine under the Hits of the World section. Only songs released as physical singles qualified for this chart during this time. During this period, the singles market in Canada was very limited in both scope and availability, and in many cases, these songs received little or no radio support. For tracks other than those by American Idol or Canadian Idol winners, sales were likely to be less than 1,000 per week. Nevertheless, this was the only singles chart Canadians had until June 2007, when the Canadian Hot 100 was made available to the public, succeeding the Canadian Digital Song Sales Chart.

Note that Billboard publishes charts with an issue date approximately 7–10 days in advance.

Chart history

Canadian Hot 100: March 2007 – December 2007

The Canadian Hot 100 was launched on the issue dated March 31, 2007 and was made available for the first time via Billboard online services on June 7, 2007. It served as the successor to the Canadian Digital Song Sales Chart. The Canadian Hot 100 emulates the formula that drives the US Billboard Hot 100, which has mingled sales and radio data since its launch in 1958. Along with SoundScan's digital sales data, the new chart is driven by BDS' Canada All-Format Airplay, with a panel of more than 100 radio stations. The comprehensive radio panel includes the country's leading top 40, rock, country and adult contemporary stations.

In 2007, eleven singles topped the Canadian Hot 100. Timbaland's "Apologize", featuring OneRepublic, was the longest-running chart-topping single of 2007; it was the number-one single for the last nine weeks of 2007, and the first four weeks in 2008. Rihanna's "Umbrella", featuring Jay-Z, stayed at number one for five straight weeks, while Avril Lavigne's "Girlfriend" and Maroon 5's "Makes Me Wonder" stayed at number one for four weeks. Timbaland was the only artist to have multiple number-one singles in 2007, and his singles were number-one for a combined 14 weeks.

Note that Billboard publishes charts with an issue date approximately 7–10 days in advance.

Chart history

See also

2007 in music
List of number-one singles (Canada)

References

Canada Singles
2007